State Road 346 (NM 346) is a  state highway in the US state of New Mexico. NM 519's western terminus is at NM 116 in Bosque, and the eastern terminus is at NM 304 north of Veguita.

Major intersections

See also

References

346
Transportation in Valencia County, New Mexico